Kan'du Ibilees is a 2018 Maldivian children's film directed by Ismail Rasheed. Produced by Rasheed, Ahmed Ziya and Mohamed Riffath under Independent Zone, the film stars Ismail Rasheed and Ahmed Ziya in pivotal roles. Filming commenced on 30 January 2018 at HDh. Kulhudhuffushi and was completed within ten days. The film was screened on 5 December 2018 at HDh. Kulhudhuffushi Thiladhekunu Cinema and is scheduled to officially release at Olympus Cinema on 1 February 2019.

Plotline
The film follows Kan'du Ibilees when he was sent on a mission by his boss to a faraway village with exclusive instructions to corrupt the mind of children where he befriends with students and distract them from their studies. He successfully keeps accomplishing his mission before two smart kids suspect his dubious character and spy on him under the guidance of the village Sheikh. Eventually, them along with the villagers, outsmart Kan'du Ibilees and burned him to flames. He then ventures off to find a new mission.

Cast 
 Ismail Rasheed as Kan'du Ibilees
 Ahmed Ziya
 Mariyam Ahmed
 Mohamed Azzam Hameed
 Abdulla Waheed
 Shiyama Ali

Music
The promotional song of the film, "Ibileehuge Vasvaas" which is performed by Bidhabin Bodeberu Group was released in March 2018.

Release
The film was screened at HDh. Kulhudhuffushi Thiladhekunu Cinema on 5 December 2018.

References

2018 films
Maldivian drama films
2010s children's films
Dhivehi-language films